Dozens of business routes of Interstate 84 (I-84) exist. The existing and former business routes are located along the western and eastern segments of I-84.

Idaho

Caldwell–Nampa business loop

Interstate 84 Business (I-84 Bus) is a business loop of I-84 from exit 27 in Caldwell to exit 38 in Nampa. It forms the terminus of State Highway 45 (SH-45) in downtown Nampa and State Highway 19 (SH-19) in downtown Caldwell.

The  business loop follows the former alignment of U.S. Route 30 (US 30), which was moved to I-84 in 1985. I-84 Bus. was created in its place. The cities of Caldwell and Nampa requested that the business loop be relinquished by the state in 2019 due to it no longer functioning as a state highway. In 2022, the Idaho Transportation Board approved a proposal to decommission I-84 Bus. and extend SH-19 over a section of it in Caldwell, but await AASHTO approval.

Former Boise business loop

Interstate 84 Business (I-84 Bus) was a former business loop of I-84 in Boise. The route ran from what is today exits 49 and 54.

Mountain Home business loop

Interstate 84 Business (I-84 Bus) is a business loop of I-84 from exit 90 to both exit 95 and exit 99 in Mountain Home, though the segment that leads to exit 99 is not marked.

Hammett business loop

Interstate 84 Business (I-84 Bus) is a business loop of I-84 from exit 112 to both exit 114 in Hammett. It runs south from a full diamond interchange along SH-78 to former US Route 26 (US 26) and US 30 east to a half diamond interchange with I-84.

Glenns Ferry business loop

Interstate 84 Business (I-84 Bus) is a business loop of I-84 from exit 120 to exit 121 in Glenns Ferry. It runs south from a half diamond interchange along Bannock Street to former US 26 and US 30 east, ending at a full diamond interchange with I-84 at East First Avenue, which connects the two former segments of Old US 26–30.

Bliss business loop

Interstate 84 Business (I-84 Bus) is a business loop of I-84 from exit 137 to exit 141 in Bliss. It begins at an unconventional interchange, specifically one with a half diamond on the eastern quadrants, a wide flying westbound onramp on the northwest corner, and a long offramp with a connecting reentry ramp on the southwest corner. From there the runs southeast overlapping US 30. I-84 Bus/US 30 climbs an embankment for a bridge over a canal and a set of railroad tracks, then makes a left turn toward the northeast. The route curves back to the southeast at a fork in the road with Proctor Street just before officially crossing the city line at the triangle with South 650 East. Further in town, the road curves straight east at the intersection with 3rd Avenue, then passes by the local church and elementary school. Just after US 30 turns right at a frontage road along I-84, I-84 Bus ends at exit 141 (this time a conventional diamond interchange) and is taken over by US 26.

Burley–Heyburn business loop

Interstate 84 Business (I-84 Bus) is a business loop of I-84 from exit 208, near Burley, to exit 211, serving Heyburn. It travels from the diamond interchange known as exit 208 at SH-27 south across a bridge over the Snake River, then turns east onto US 30. The two highways travel concurrently and pass by Burley Municipal Airport. They curve to the northeast and cross a second bridge over the Snake River, where they enter Heyburn. I-84 Bus eventually ends at a quarter cloverleaf interchange known as exit 211 with I-84. From there, US 30 joins I-84 in yet another concurrency, while the road that is used for I-84 Bus continues as SH-24.

Utah

Tremonton business loop

Interstate 84 Business (I-84 Bus) is a business loop of I-84 along State Route 102 (SR-102), I-15 Bus, and SR-13 in Tremonton and Elwood.

I-84 Bus begins at exit 40 on I-84 and follows SR-102 (West Main Street), then goes under bridges for I-15 with no access. At Iowa String Road, the route is joined by I-15 Bus, and both I-15 Bus/I-84 Bus run east along SR-102. At North and South Tremonton streets, I-15 Bus/I-84 Bus/SR-102 changes from West Main Street to East Main Street. Well beyond the developed areas of Tremonton, I-15 Bus/I-84 Bus encounters the intersection with SR-13 (4700th Street West) and turn south onto that route, while SR-102 continues east toward Deweyville. Between the first and second intersections south of there, I-15 Bus/I-84 Bus/SR-13 enters Elwood and all three routes continue to run straight south. I-15 Bus and I-84 Bus both end at exit 376 in Elwood at the I-15/I-84 overlap, while SR-13 continues to run south toward Corinne and other communities.

Brigham City business loop

Interstate 84 Business (I-84 Bus) is a business loop of I-84 along I-15 Bus in Brigham City.

The route begins at a folded diamond interchange with I-15/I-84 at exit 365 and runs south along SR-13. The reason for the folded diamond is due to the fact that the segment of SR-13 that the routes originally overlap runs along the north side of a Union Pacific Railroad line. The tracks move away from the road between North 1100th West Street, and 950th West Street, only to cross under a low bridge for another Union Pacific Railroad line, and then another bridge for North 500th West Street.

I-15 Bus/I-84 Bus/SR-13 curves to the right before turning south at the intersection with North Main Street, which is also the southern terminus of SR-38. The routes cross over a bridge over Box Elder Creek between 500th Street North and 400th Street North. At Forest Street, North Main Street becomes South Main Street, which runs under the Brigham City Archway. One and a half blocks later, they intersect 200th Street South, which also serves as the western terminus of SR-90, and instantly runs between the National Register of Historic Places-listed Box Elder Stake Tabernacle on the southeast corner of that intersection, and the contemporary but still traditional Brigham City Utah Temple on the southwest corner.

SR-13 ends at the southern terminus of the overlap of US 89/US 91, and I-15 Bus/I-84 Bus makes a sharp right turn along southbound US 91, while South Main Street is taken over by southbound US 89. I-15 Bus/I-84 Bus/US 91 runs west along West 1100th Street South. I-15 Bus/I-84 Bus ends at exit 362, a diverging diamond interchange with I-15/I-84, while West 1100th Street South continues into the I-15 frontage road, and becomes a dead-end street at the truck stop along the aforementioned frontage road.

Former Morgan business loop

Interstate 84 Business (I-84 Bus) was a business loop of I-84 along in Morgan. It ran north along SR-66 at exit 103 (State Street) to East 600th Street running along the north side of I-84 until the former westbound-offramp and eastbound onramp that was once westbound exit 103 until the mid-1990s.

Former Henefer business loop

Interstate 84 Business (I-84 Bus) was a business loop of I-84 along in Henefer. It ran southeast along the southwest side of I-84 on what is today SR-86 from exit 112 to SR-65 at exit 115.

Connecticut

Former Newtown business loop

Interstate 84 Business (I-84 Bus) was a former business loop of I-84 for Newtown. The route ran from what is today exit 9 at Route 25 in Hawleyville then runs along US 6 to exit 10 at Church Hill Road Route 34 in Sandy Hook.

References

External links
Interstate Business Route 84 (InterstateGuide.com)

84
Interstate 84 (Oregon–Utah)
Interstate 84 (Pennsylvania–Massachusetts)